Haliplus crassus is a species of beetle in the Haliplidae family that can be found in Brazil, Panama, Paraguay, and Venezuela. It flies from May to October.

References

Beetles described in 1930
Beetles of South America
Haliplidae